List of Alpha Gamma Rho chapters:

References 

chapters
Lists of chapters of United States student societies by society